Jacomina de Witte (1582, The Hague – 1661, Zierikzee?) was the central figure in a famous corruption case in the Netherlands in 1649.

Daughter of mayor Jacob de Witte and Jacomina Weijtsen. Since 1617 the spouse of Johan Oem van Wijngaarden, president of the legal court, she was accused of having accepted bribes in exchange for manipulating court cases through the office of her husband, for selling information and bribing officials of the court. She was put on trial in 1649, and was said to have been active in this role for thirty years. The trial attracted a lot of attention, and several women of the aristocracy, notably Amalia van Solms, was rumoured to have been involved. Her husband was freed from having been involved, while she was judged guilty in her absence and sentenced to exile and fined. She lived the rest of her life hidden from the authorities.

The Witte case led to a law change banning gifts to officials or their family members.

References 
 http://www.inghist.nl/Onderzoek/Projecten/DVN/lemmata/data/Witte
 DVN, een project van Huygens ING en OGC (UU). Bronvermelding: Maarten Hell, Witte, Jacomina de, in: Digitaal Vrouwenlexicon van Nederland. URL: http://resources.huygens.knaw.nl/vrouwenlexicon/lemmata/data/Witte [13/01/2014] 

1582 births
1661 deaths
17th-century Dutch women
17th-century Dutch criminals
Dutch fraudsters
Criminals from The Hague